Akurdi Station is a suburban railway station of Pune Suburban Railway. The station is in Sector-26 of Nigdi Pradhikaran. All suburban (local) trains between Pune Junction–, Pune Junction–Talegaon, –, Shivajinagar–Talegaon stop here. It is a major local station for students travelling from Pune to D Y Patil College of Engineering, Akurdi and Pimpri-Chinchwad College of Engineering, Nigdi which is at a walking distance.

Trains
Six medium-long range trains halt at Akurdi railway station. All six are passenger trains. Akurdi station has two platforms and a foot overbridge. Nearby areas are Ravet, Walhekarwadi, Bijli Nagar and Sector 26, 25, 27, 27A, 28, 29, 30, 32A of Nigdi Pradhikaran.

References

Pune Suburban Railway
Pune railway division
Railway stations in Pune district
Transport in Pimpri-Chinchwad